Aziatix was a Korean–American hip hop and R&B trio consisting of members Flowsik, Eddie Shin, and Nicky Lee. The group, which was based in Seoul, South Korea, debuted in 2011 and won Best New Asian Artist at the Mnet Asian Music Awards later that year. In 2013, the group signed a lucrative contract with Cash Money Records, which was the largest record deal to date between a U.S. record label and a music act from Asia. The name of the group is a variation of the word "asiatic". Aziatix disbanded in 2015.

Career
The members of Aziatix were brought together by record producer and former R&B singer Jae Chong. At the time of the group's formation, Flowsik was an established underground rapper in New York City, Eddie Shin was a student at NYU, and Nicky Lee was a successful Mandopop singer.

Aziatix released their first single, "Go," in March 2011 and their self-titled EP, Aziatix, in May 2011. In July, they released their first full-length album, Nocturnal, which charted in Taiwan and South Korea at numbers 14 and 35, respectively. At the end of the year, Aziatix won Best New Asian Artist at the 2011 Mnet Asian Music Awards.

In March 2012, the group performed at the U.S. music festival South by Southwest. In May, the group released their second EP, Awakening, which again charted in Taiwan and South Korea, at numbers 11 and 32, respectively.

In 2013, Aziatix signed an 11.3 million USD record deal with Cash Money Records. It was the largest record deal to date between a U.S. record label and a music act from Asia. However, in December 2014, Aziatix announced on their Facebook page that they had decided to leave the record label.

Aziatix released their last album, Top Of The World, in August 2015.

Discography

Studio albums

Extended plays

Singles

Awards

References 

American hip hop groups
South Korean hip hop groups
Musical groups established in 2011
Musical groups disestablished in 2015
Cash Money Records artists
2011 establishments in the United States